The Central Bank of Madagascar (BCM) is the central bank of Madagascar.

The bank's mission is to, in collaboration with the general government, and in observation of the laws of finance, to maintain the general political economy of Madagascar; and to maintain the national monetary reserves. The offices of the bank are located in Antananarivo.

The Central Bank of Madagascar is active in developing financial inclusion policy and is a member of the Alliance for Financial Inclusion.

History
The Banque Centrale de Madagascar has origins in the Banque de Madagascar, which issued the Madagascar-Comores CFA franc, beginning in 1925, as Madagascar's currency. In 1945, after the creation of Territory of Comoros, the Banque de Madagascar et des Comores was formed ; concurrent with the creation of many other African franc currencies. 

After Madagascar's independence from France in 1960, Madagascar began issuing the Malagasy franc (MGF) again, as the currencies of the Comoros and Madagascar were separated.  

In 1973, Madagascar left the CFA franc zone and the Malagasy franc was declared inconvertible by the authorities of the Confederation Franc Africaine.  Madagascar's coins and banknotes were then issued by Madagascar's Institut d'Émission Malgache until 1974 when the Banque Centrale de Madagascar was formed.  Since 2005, the Malagasy ariary (MGA), issued by the Banque Centrale de Madagascar, has been the country's currency.

Operations
The bank maintains departments of microfinance and of economic research.

The BCM reports to the government agency: Commission de Supervision Bancaire et Financière.

The bank maintains 2 branches and 8 agency offices:

Branches:
Toamasina TMS
Fianarantsoa FIA

Agency Offices:
Antsiranana ATS
Nosy Be NSB
Mahajanga MGA
Sambava SBV
Manakara MKR
Tolagnaro FTD
Morondava MDV
Toliary TUL

List of governors
1973-1983 : Leon Maxime Rajaobelina
1984-1988 : Richard Randriamaholy
1988-1993 : Blandin Razafimanjato
1993-1994 : Raoul Joëlson Ravelomanana
1996-2007 : Gaston Edouard Ravelojaona
2007-2012 : Frédéric Rasamoely
2012-2013 : Guy Ratovondrahona (acting)
2013-2014 : Vonimanitra Razafimbelo (acting)
2014-2019 : Alain Rasolofondraibe
2019-2023 : Henri Rabarijohn
since January 2023: Aivo Andrianarivelo

See also

Economy of Madagascar
List of central banks
Malagasy ariary, the unit of currency from 2005
Malagasy franc former currency
List of central banks of Africa

References

External links
  Official site of Banque Centrale de Madagascar 
 BCM Organizational Chart

Madagascar
Banks of Madagascar
Economy of Madagascar
Companies based in Antananarivo
Banks established in 1974
1974 establishments in Madagascar